Venginissery  is a suburb in Thrissur district in the state of Kerala, India.

Demographics 
 India census, Venginissery had a population of 5647 with 2745 males and 2902 females.

Venginissery is situated just 8 km away from Thrissur town. It is the main destination for village tourism in Trichur district.
there is a famous temple, AYKUNNU PANDAVAGIRI DEVI KSHETHRAM. A Roman Catholic Church in the name of St. Mary is situated just near to the temple.

Venginissery falls under the Paralam Panchayath, a consolidation of five villages namely Ammadam, Kodannur, Pallippuram, Venginissery and Chenam.

Formerly Venginissery was part of the Cherpu constituency but now it is in Nattika's.

Religion

Temples

Church 
St Mary's Christian Church

Education 
Gurukulam Public School :- In 1994, Gurukulam Public School entered a new phase when the Trust acquired about eight acres of land on the serenely located Aykunnu hill in Venginissery Village which is about 8 km away from Thrissur town. The land was just apt for developing a full-fledged CBSE school having adequate area for playground and buildings.

C.A. Lower Primary School :- Syro-Malabar Church School

References

Villages in Thrissur district